North Bonneville is a city in the Columbia River Gorge National Scenic Area along the Columbia River in  Skamania County, Washington, United States. The population was 593 at the 2000 census and 956 at the 2010 census.

History

The community of North Bonneville developed as a construction town next to the massive Bonneville Lock, Dam, and powerhouse project begun in late 1933. Federal legislation in 1937 also authorized a second Powerhouse, although the need was not then immediate. North Bonneville was officially incorporated on June 25, 1935.

The Columbia's north shore where North Bonneville had grown was selected by federal agencies in 1971 as the site for the second Powerhouse. Faced with the prospect of being displaced and disbanded the townspeople determined to relocate as a community. Intense efforts by citizens’ groups and planning assistance from state sources finally led to agreements with the U.S. Army Corps of Engineers to hire professionals for the design and construction of a new town. Contractors then prepared the chosen town site for the initial community of 600 people as the old town was devoured by the enormous excavation for the new powerhouse.

Federal responsibility for the North Bonneville relocation was expanded in 1974 with enactment of Public Law 93-251, referred to as the McCormack legislation. This law specifically broadened the Corps' authority and obligation in relocation assistance to North Bonneville . The $35 million relocation project included raising the new town site above the 100-year flood plain, construction of streets, utilities, lighting, sewage system, water supply and sewage treatment plant, flood protection, parks, a central business district and all public buildings. Town sitting required highway and railway relocation. And residents and business were furnished temporary housing until they could build their own permanent homes and facilities. The new town was built to accommodate 1500 residents. A celebration of the successful relocation was held on July 29, 1978.

Public Development Authority
Following the legalization of cannabis by a 2012 voter initiative in Washington State, the North Bonneville Public Development Authority was created to manage a city-owned cannabis retail store that opened on March 7, 2015. It was notable for operating Cannabis Corner, the first government-owned cannabis shop in the United States.

Geography

The city is located on Washington State Route 14 between Skamania and the city of Stevenson.

Climate
This region experiences warm (but not hot) and dry summers, with no average monthly temperatures above 71.6 °F.  According to the Köppen Climate Classification system, North Bonneville has a warm-summer Mediterranean climate, abbreviated "Csb" on climate maps.

Demographics

2010 census
As of the census of 2010, there were 956 people, 420 households, and 262 families residing in the city. The racial makeup of the city was 94.9% White, 0.3% African American, 0.7% Native American, 1.5% Asian, 0.6% from other races, and 2.0% from two or more races. Hispanic or Latino of any race were 4.4% of the population.

There were 420 households, of which 28.6% had children under the age of 18 living with them, 45.7% were married couples living together, 10.0% had a female householder with no husband present, 6.7% had a male householder with no wife present, and 37.6% were non-families. 33.6% of all households were made up of individuals, and 11.5% had someone living alone who was 65 years of age or older. The average household size was 2.28 and the average family size was 2.86.

The median age in the city was 42.8 years. 24.1% of residents were under the age of 18; 6.1% were between the ages of 18 and 24; 22.7% were from 25 to 44; 32.5% were from 45 to 64; and 14.7% were 65 years of age or older. The gender makeup of the city was 50.2% male and 49.8% female.

2000 census
As of the census of 2000, there were 593 people, 228 households, and 171 families residing in the city. The population density was 246.1 people per square mile (95.0/km2). There were 237 housing units at an average density of 98.3 per square mile (38.0/km2). The racial makeup of the city was 92.75% White, 0.34% African American, 0.84% Native American, 2.53% Asian, 1.52% from other races, and 2.02% from two or more races. Hispanic or Latino of any race were 1.69% of the population.

There were 228 households, out of which 38.2% had children under the age of 18 living with them, 61.0% were married couples living together, 10.1% had a female householder with no husband present, and 25.0% were non-families. 20.6% of all households were made up of individuals, and 7.9% had someone living alone who was 65 years of age or older. The average household size was 2.60 and the average family size was 3.01.

In the city, the age distribution of the population shows 27.5% under the age of 18, 5.2% from 18 to 24, 29.8% from 25 to 44, 24.3% from 45 to 64, and 13.2% who were 65 years of age or older. The median age was 38 years. For every 100 females, there were 103.8 males. For every 100 females age 18 and over, there were 97.2 males.

The median income for a household in the city was $35,583, and the median income for a family was $38,333. Males had a median income of $32,857 versus $25,313 for females. The per capita income for the city was $16,921. About 7.3% of families and 7.2% of the population were below the poverty line, including 8.2% of those under age 18 and 5.9% of those age 65 or over.

Parks and recreation
North Bonneville is situated within the Columbia River Gorge National Scenic Area, which contains nearby recreational areas including Beacon Rock State Park and the Pierce National Wildlife Refuge. The area has nearby access to the Pacific Crest Trail, and hikers can access Greenleaf Peak and Table Mountain which are in close proximity to the community.

People can visit Bonneville Dam and its spillway, which are visible from the city. Another important engineering project on the Columbia River, the Bridge of the Gods is northeast of North Bonneville.

See also

 List of cities in Washington

References

External links

 
 North Bonneville Community

Cities in Washington (state)
Cities in Skamania County, Washington
Columbia River Gorge
Washington (state) populated places on the Columbia River